Mackworth Island State Park is an approximately  island in Falmouth, Maine, United States, adjacent to its border with Portland, Maine.  In 1631, Sir Ferdinando Gorges gave the island to Arthur Mackworth, his deputy in Casco Bay, and the island has retained his name.  There is a causeway connecting the island to the mainland in Falmouth. Visitors to the island must pass a state park entrance tollhouse and pay an entrance fee; cars can enter the island but parking is limited. There is a footpath around the perimeter of the island with views of Falmouth, Portland, and other islands surrounding the bay. The island is heavily wooded. One portion of the woods is dedicated to “Fairy Houses” which are constructed by visitors using natural materials found on the island.  Mackworth Island has a beautiful rocky shore and offers ample opportunities for surf fisherman of Bluefish and Stripers.
There is a nominal 3 dollar entrance fee per person. 
Although most areas of the island are State Park lands, there is a school area that is not open to the public. The island is also home to the Governor Baxter Dog Memorial, a pet cemetery where fourteen of the former governor's Irish Setters and one of his horses were laid to rest, accompanied by two bronze markers and a gravestone, all enclosed by a circular stone wall.

Governor Baxter School for The Deaf 

In 1943, Maine's governor Percival P. Baxter deeded the island and causeway, including his summer home, to the State of Maine. In 1957, the state created the Governor Baxter School for The Deaf (formerly known as the Maine School for The Deaf) on the island. The school is infamous for a sexual abuse scandal which became public in 1981 and involved the school's principal and superintendent. 
There is currently still a school operating at this site.

Friends School of Portland 

Friends School of Portland, an independent Quaker preschool through eighth grade school, was founded in 2006 and was located on Mackworth Island until 2015, when it moved to new facility in nearby Cumberland, Maine.

See also
 List of islands of Maine

References

Bibiliography
Soares, Liz. All for Maine: The Story of Governor Percival P. Baxter. Windswept House Publishers (1996).

External links
 Mackworth Island State Park Department of Agriculture, Conservation and Forestry

Islands of Portland, Maine
Falmouth, Maine
Islands of Casco Bay
State parks of Maine
Parks in Cumberland County, Maine